Akanksha Deo Sharma is an Indian industrial designer, textile innovator and visual artist. Her works combine Indian textile history, handicrafts and construction techniques to develop a minimal, clean and playful outcome. In 2020 she is enlisted on #8 in Forbes India 30 Under 30 list. She is the only girl from Indian working with IKEA, a Dutch-based Swedish multinational group.

Early life
Akanksha Deo Sharma studying in commerce background and after she attends the National Institute of Fashion Technology in New Delhi.  After her graduation in 2016, she went to Sweden for a 10-month internship. Currently, she is working in Gurugram for IKEA. 
She had before also worked with various brands such as Cell Design, Raw Mango, and Love Birds.

Awards
 Elle Decor India Best Designer Award 2009

References

1992 births
Indian textile designers
IKEA people
National Institute of Fashion Technology alumni
Living people